Sadni Falls (also called Sadnighagh Falls) is a waterfall located about  from Rajadera village in Gumla district in the Indian state of Jharkhand.

Geography

Location
Sadni Falls is located at

The Falls
The  falls on the Sankh River is a scarp fall. It is referred to as a snake type falls and is a popular picnic spot. Its surroundings are spectacular with hillocks, forests and streams.

History
Once upon a time, active diamond mines existed at Sadni Falls. These mines yielded many large and fine stones in the sixteenth and the seventeenth centuries.

Transport

By rail 
The nearest town Netarhat does not have a railway station. The closest railway station is at Ranchi, which is 110 kilometres away.

By road 
There are regular bus services between Ranchi, the state capital and Netarhat. Sadni falls lie at a distance of 35 kilometres from Netarhat.

See also
List of waterfalls in India
List of waterfalls in India by height

References

Waterfalls of Jharkhand